The Nakajima Ki-43 Hayabusa ("Peregrine falcon", "Army Type 1 Fighter" ) is a single-engine land-based tactical fighter used by the Imperial Japanese Army Air Service in World War II.

The Allied reporting name was "Oscar", but it was often called the "Army Zero" by American pilots because it bore a certain resemblance to the Mitsubishi A6M Zero, the Imperial Japanese Navy's counterpart to the Ki-43. Both aircraft had generally similar layout and lines, and also used essentially the same Nakajima Sakae radial engine, with similar round cowlings and bubble-type canopies (the Oscar's being distinctly smaller and having much less framing than the A6M). While relatively easy for a trained eye to tell apart with the "finer" lines of the Ki-43's fuselage – especially towards the tail – and more tapered wing planform; in the heat of battle, given the brief glimpses and distraction of combat, Allied aviators frequently made mistakes in enemy aircraft identification in the heat of a dogfight, reportedly having fought "Zeros" in areas where there were no Navy fighters.

Like the Zero, the radial-engined Ki-43 was light and easy to fly and became legendary for its combat performance in East Asia in the early years of the war. It could outmaneuver any opponent, but did not initially have armor or self-sealing fuel tanks, and its armament was poor until its final version, which was produced as late as 1945. Allied pilots often reported that the nimble Ki-43s were difficult targets but burned easily or broke apart with few hits.

Total production amounted to 5,919 aircraft. Many of these were used during the last months of the war for kamikaze missions against the American fleet.

Design and development
The Ki-43 was designed by Hideo Itokawa, who would later become famous as a pioneer of Japanese rocketry. The Ki-43 prototype was produced in response to a December 1937 specification for a successor to the popular fixed-gear Nakajima Ki-27 Nate. Maneuverability was to be at least as good as that of Ki-27.

When first flown in early January 1939, the Ki-43 prototype was a disappointment. Japanese test pilots complained that it was less maneuverable than the Ki-27 Nate and not much faster. In order to solve these problems, Nakajima produced a series of progressively modified prototypes through 1939 and 1940. These changes involved a major weight saving program, a slimmer fuselage with the tail surfaces moved further aft and a new canopy. Crucially, the 11th prototype introduced the unique differential "butterfly" maneuvering Fowler flaps, which dramatically improved performance in tight turns. The 13th prototype combined all these changes, and tests of this aircraft resulted in an instruction for Nakajima to place the Ki-43 into production, the Ki-27 jigs being transferred to the Mansyu factory at Harbin in Japanese occupied Manchukuo.

The Ki-43 (Oscar) was initially produced in November 1939, given the designation Ki-43-I. Deliveries from Nakajima's Ota factory commenced in February 1941. In addition to outstanding maneuverability, the Ki-43-I had an impressive rate of climb due to its light weight. Power was provided by the Nakajima Ha-25 engine turning a two-bladed, two-position variable-pitch metal propeller. The configuration that appears to have been most prevalent at the outset of the war was the first configuration with two  Type 89 machine guns, while as the war progressed the heavier combinations gained popularity and the version with the heaviest armament was sometimes given the designation Ki-43-Ic. The Ho-103 was often loaded with explosive ammunition to increase target effect; its penetrative effect against later Allied aircraft armor appears to have been marginal.

Prototypes for the Ki-43-II flew in February 1942. The Ha-25 engine was upgraded with the 2-stage supercharger, thus becoming the more powerful Nakajima Ha-115 engine, which was installed in a longer-chord cowling. The new engine turned a three-bladed propeller. The wing structure, which had suffered failures in the Ki-43-I, was strengthened and equipped with racks for drop tanks or bombs. The Ki-43-II was also fitted with a  armor plate for the pilot's head and back, and the aircraft's fuel tanks were coated in rubber to form a crude self-sealing tank. This was later replaced by a 3-layer rubber bladder, 8mm core construction; with 2mm oil-proof lamination. The bladder proved to be highly resistant against  bullets, but was not as effective against larger calibers. The pilot also enjoyed a slightly taller canopy and a reflector gunsight in place of the earlier telescopic gunsight. Nakajima commenced production of the Ki-43-II at its Ota factory in November 1942. Production was also started at the Tachikawa Hikoki KK and the 1st Army Air Arsenal (Tachikawa Dai-Ichi Rikugun Kokusho), also at Tachikawa. Although Tachikawa Hikoki successfully managed to enter into large-scale production of the Ki-43, the 1st Army Air Arsenal was less successful – hampered by a shortage of skilled workers, it was ordered to stop production after 49 Ki-43s were built. Nakajima eventually ceased production in mid-1944 in favor of the Ki-84 Hayate, but the Tachikawa Hikoki continued to produce the Ki-43.

Tachikawa also produced the Ki-43-III, which utilized the more powerful Nakajima Army Type 1 Ha-115-II engine. Tachikawa produced 2124 Ki-43-II and -III aircraft between April 1944 and the end of the war. Total production of all versions amounted to 5,919 aircraft.

Operational history

The Ki-43 was the most widely used Army fighter, and equipped 30 sentai FR (flight regiment) and 12 chutai IS (independent squadron). The first unit equipped with the Ki 43-I was the 59th FR at Hankow Airfield, during June–August 1941 and began operational sorties over Hengyang on 29 October 1941. The second unit to re-equip with the new Aircraft was the 64th FR, from August to November 1941.

The first version, Ki-43-I, entered service in 1941, the Ki-43-II in December 1942, the Ki-43-II-Kai in June 1943, and the Ki-43-IIIa in summer 1944. The aircraft fought in China, Burma, the Malay Peninsula, New Guinea, the Philippines, South Pacific islands and the Japanese home islands.

Like the Zero, the Ki-43 initially enjoyed air superiority in the skies of Malaya, Netherlands East Indies, Burma and New Guinea. This was partly due to the better performance of the Oscar and partly due to the relatively small numbers of combat-ready Allied fighters, mostly the Curtiss P-36 Hawk, Curtiss P-40, Brewster Buffalo, Hawker Hurricane and Curtiss-Wright CW-21 in Asia and the Pacific during the first months of the war. As the war progressed, however, the fighter suffered from the same weaknesses as the slower, fixed-gear Ki-27 "Nate" predecessor to the Oscar, and the more advanced naval A6M Zero; light armor and less-than-effective self-sealing fuel tanks, which caused high casualties in combat. Its armament of two machine guns also proved inadequate against the more heavily armored Allied aircraft. As newer Allied aircraft were introduced, such as the Republic P-47 Thunderbolt, Lockheed P-38 Lightning, North American P-51 Mustang, Vought F4U Corsair, Grumman F6F Hellcat, Yakovlev Yak-9, Yakovlev Yak-3U and late-model Supermarine Spitfire/Seafire, the Japanese were forced into a defensive war and most aircraft were flown by inexperienced pilots. However, even near the end, the Oscar's excellent maneuverability could still gain advantage over rash Allied pilots.

From October to December 1944, 17 Ki-43s were shot down in air combat; their pilots claimed seven C-47s, five Consolidated B-24 Liberators, two Spitfires, two Bristol Beaufighters, two de Havilland Mosquitoes, two F4U Corsairs, two Boeing B-29 Superfortresses, one F6F Hellcat, one P-38, and one North American B-25 Mitchell. Like most Japanese combat types, many Hayabusas were at the end expended in kamikaze strikes.

The Ki-43 also served in an air defense role over Formosa, Okinawa and the Japanese home islands. Some examples were supplied to the pro-Japanese regimes of Thailand, Manchukuo and Wang Jingwei Government as well. The Thai units sometimes fought against the USAAF in southern China.

Hayabusas were well liked in the JAAF because of the pleasant flight characteristics and excellent maneuverability, and almost all JAAF fighter aces claimed victories with Hayabusa in some part of their career. At the end of the war, most Hayabusa units received Nakajima Ki-84 Hayate "Frank" and Kawasaki Ki-100 fighters, but some units flew the Hayabusa to the end of the war. The top-scoring Hayabusa pilot was Sergeant Satoshi Anabuki with 39 confirmed victories, almost all scored with the Ki-43.

After the war, some captured examples served in limited numbers in the French Air Force in Indochina against Viet Minh rebels.

Ki-43s abandoned in the Netherlands East Indies were taken over by the newly declared Indonesian government and put into service during the fight against Dutch forces.

Variants

Ki-43
13 Prototypes/pre-production aircraft.
Ki-43-I "Ko" (Mark 1a)
Variant armed with 2 ×  Type 89 machine guns.
Ki-43-I "Otsu" (Mark 1b)
Variant armed with one  Ho-103 machine gun and 1 ×  Type 89.
Ki-43-I "Hei" (Mark 1c)
Variant armed with 2 ×  Ho-103, plus ability to mount 2x30kg bombs under wings. All earlier Ki-43-Ia "Ko" and Ki-43-Ib "Otsu" were gradually upgraded to this version as more Ho-103 became available.
Ki-43-II
5 Prototypes, introduced the Ha-115 engine with two stage supercharger, shorter and stronger wings, self-sealing fuel tanks,  of pilot armor, reflector sight, three-bladed fixed pitch propeller, and an improved canopy.
Ki-43-II "Ko" (Mark 2a)
First Ki-43-II production model. Improvements of the 5 prototypes added into the design.
Ki-43-II "Ko" upgraded
Oil ring cooler changed to honeycomb type mounted under the nose. Improved landing light. 
Ki-43-IIb "Otsu" (Mark 2b)
Fuel cooling system added on some examples. Both exhaust pipes were angled backwards for slightly increased thrust. Universal drop tank racks mounted outboard of landing gear on later examples. (earlier models sometimes had mounting points slightly inboard of the landing gear or on the centerline)
Ki-43-II-KAI (Mark 2 improved)
Later examples could carry bombs on the drop tank mountings. This variant was tested with skis for operations from snow in Manchuria. Fitted with ejector exhaust stacks (adding approximately 30 hp) and additional  fuel tank in fuselage.
Ki-43-III
Prototypes powered by Nakajima Ha-115-II engine of 920 kW (1,230 hp) Exhaust stack configuration slightly modified. Water-methanol injection added.
Ki-43-III "Ko" (Mark 3a)Only produced by Tachikawa plant.
Series production model, some fitted with skis for operations from snow. 
Ki-43-III "Otsu" (Mark 3b)
Variant with the Mitsubishi Ha-112-II radial engine and armed with twin  Ho-5 cannon. (Prototype – only 2 Built)
Ki-62 Project

Production

Not included:
 Ki-43-I's pre-production started with three prototypes completed in December 1938, as well as in February and March 1940. A further ten service trials aircraft were built from Nov. 1939 to Sept. 1940.
 Ki-43-II's pre-production started with five prototypes completed during Feb. to May 1942. A further three service trials aircraft were built from June to Aug. 1942.
 Ki-43-III's pre-production started with ten prototypes completed during May 1944 to August 1945.

Not included:
 A further 49 Ki-43-II's were assembled from Oct. 1943 to Nov. 1944 at Tachikawa Dai-Ichi Rikugun Kokusho arsenal plant.

Operators

Wartime

 Imperial Japanese Army Air Force

 Manchukuo Air Force

 Royal Thai Air Force Operates 24 Ki-43 IIB aircraft.

Postwar

 Nationalist Chinese Air Force
 6th Group
 Two squadrons operated captured aircraft.

 Chinese Communist Air Force operated five aircraft captured from nationalists from 1946 until 1952.

 French Air Force Escadron de Chasse 1/7 operated captured aircraft in 1945–1946 Indo-China.

 Indonesian Air Force repaired derelict aircraft to fight Dutch colonial rule. In 1947, the Ki-43 currently at the Museum Dirgantara Udara Yogyakarta near Adisucipto International Airport was to bomb Dutch strategic positions however mechanical problems grounded it.

 North Korean Air Force operated repaired derelict aircraft after the war.

Surviving aircraft

 750 – Ki-43-I on display at Flying Heritage Collection in Everett, Washington. Former ZK-OSC restored to flying condition by the Alpine Fighter Collection in the 1990s, not currently flying.
 5465 – Ki-43-II displayed unrestored at the Australian War Museum in Canberra, Australian Capital Territory. The nose and tail are in the main museum building, while the wings and center section are in storage.
 6430 – Ki-43-IIb on display at the Pima Air & Space Museum in Tucson, Arizona. This aircraft was previously on display at the EAA AirVenture Museum and the Museum of Flight and is on loan from the National Air and Space Museum.
 Reproduction – Ki-43-IIIa on display at the Museum of Flight in Seattle, Washington. This aircraft contains parts from four different wrecks. The restoration was begun by the Texas Airplane Factory and completed by GossHawk Unlimited.
 Reproduction – Ki-43-IIIa at the Ericson Aircraft Collection in Madras, Oregon. This aircraft was previously at the Tillamook Air Museum in Tillamook, Oregon.
 Reproduction – Ki-43 originally under restoration/rebuild at Texas Airplane Factory, Meacham Field, Fort Worth, Texas from 4 wrecks. Now located at GossHawk Unlimited in Casa Grande, Arizona.
 Reproduction – Ki-43 originally under restoration/rebuild at Texas Airplane Factory, Meacham Field, Fort Worth, Texas. Now located at GossHawk Unlimited in Casa Grande, Arizona.
 Reproduction – Ki-43 on display outside Chiran Peace Museum for Kamikaze Pilots, Minamikyūshū, Kagoshima, Japan.
 Unknown msn – Ki-43 awaiting restoration at The Fighter Collection in Duxford, United Kingdom.
 Unknown serial number – Ki-43 on display at Dirgantara Mandala Museum in Yogyakarta.
 Unknown serial number – Ki-43 under restoration at the Kawaguchiko Motor Museum / Fighter Museum in Kawaguchiko, Yamanashi.

Specifications (Ki-43-IIb)

See also

References

Notes

Bibliography
 Bueschel, Richard M. Nakajima Ki-43 Hayabusa I-III in Japanese Army Air Force RTAF-CAF-IPSF Service. Reading, Berkshire, UK: Osprey Publications, 1970. .
 .
 
 
 
 
 Green, William. Warplanes of the Second World War, Volume Three: Fighters. London: Macdonald & Co. (Publishers), 1973 (seventh impression), First edition 1961. .

 Green, William and Gordon Swanborough. WW2 Aircraft Fact Files, Japanese Army Fighters, part 2. London: Macdonald and Janes's, 1977. .

 Ichimura, Hiroshi. Ki-43 'Oscar' Aces of World War II. Oxford, UK: Osprey, 2009. .
 
 
 Pajdosz, Waldemar, Mark T. Wlodarczyk and Adam Jarski. Nakajima Ki 43 Hayabusa "Oscar" (in Polish), Monografie Lotnicze 48. Gdańsk: AJ-Press, 1998. .
 Skulski, Przemysław. Nakajima Ki 43 Hayabusa "Oscar", seria Pod Lupa no.11 (Polish/English). Wrocław: Ace Publications, 1999. .

 
 United States Strategic Bombing Survey Aircraft Division. Nakajima Aircraft Company, Ltd. Corporation Report II, Washington, D.C. 1947.
 United States Strategic Bombing Survey Aircraft Division. Tachikawa Aircraft Company, Ltd. Corporation Report X, Washington, D.C. 1947.
 </ref>

External links

 Nathan Sturman's Homepage
 Joe Baugher's Hayabusa files
 Nakajima Type 1 Model 1 Army Fighter (Ki 43-I) Armament – A Reassessment by Richard L. Dunn

Ki-043
Ki-43, Nakajima
Single-engined tractor aircraft
Low-wing aircraft
Ki-043, Nakajima
Aircraft first flown in 1939